The following is a list of all suspensions and fines enforced in the National Hockey League during the 2009–10 NHL season. It lists which players or coaches of what team have been punished for which offense and the amount of punishment they have received.

Suspensions

Fines

See also 
 2009-10 NHL transactions
 2009 NHL Entry Draft
 2009 in sports
 2010 in sports
 List of 2009–10 NHL Three Star Awards

References

Suspension And Fines
National Hockey League suspensions and fines